USS Alaska (ID-3035) was a minesweeper that served in the United States Navy from 1918 to 1919.

Alaska was built as a steam-powered commercial fishing trawler in 1881 at Boothbay, Maine.  The U.S. Navy chartered her for World War I service from the Fisheries Products Company of Wilmington, North Carolina, on 18 September 1918. She was assigned the naval registry Identification Number (Id. No.) 3035 and commissioned the same day as USS Alaska at Charleston Navy Yard at Charleston, South Carolina.

Converted for service as a minesweeper, Alaska served in the Charleston area for the remainder of World War I and briefly thereafter as a minesweeper and patrol vessel.

The U.S. Navy returned Alaska to the Fisheries Products Company on 10 January 1919, and her name was stricken from the Navy Directory that same day.

References
 
 Department of the Navy: Naval Historical Center Online Library of Selected Images: Civilian Ships: Alaska (American Fishing Trawler, 1881). Served as USS Alaska (ID # 3035) in 1918–1919
 NavSource Online: Section Patrol Craft Photo Archive: Alaska (ID 3035)

Minesweepers of the United States Navy
World War I minesweepers of the United States
Ships built in Boothbay, Maine
1881 ships